Josephville is a village in St. Charles County, Missouri, United States. The population was 376 at the 2010 census.

History
A post office called Josephville opened in 1875, and remained in operation until 1910. The community was named for its first postmaster, Joseph Wilmes.

Geography
Josephville is located at  (38.831080, -90.799463).

Demographics

2010 census
As of the census of 2010, there were 376 people, 133 households, and 110 families living in the village. The racial makeup of the village was 96.5% White, 1.1% African American, 0.8% Native American, 0.3% Asian, 0.8% from other races, and 0.5% from two or more races. Hispanic or Latino of any race were 0.5% of the population.

There were 133 households, of which 32.3% had children under the age of 18 living with them, 70.7% were married couples living together, 7.5% had a female householder with no husband present, 4.5% had a male householder with no wife present, and 17.3% were non-families. 12.0% of all households were made up of individuals, and 5.3% had someone living alone who was 65 years of age or older. The average household size was 2.83 and the average family size was 3.12.

The median age in the village was 44.7 years. 23.7% of residents were under the age of 18; 8.1% were between the ages of 18 and 24; 18.6% were from 25 to 44; 37% were from 45 to 64; and 12.5% were 65 years of age or older. The gender makeup of the village was 49.2% male and 50.8% female.

2000 census
As of the census of 2000, there were 270 people, 91 households, and 70 families living in the village. The racial makeup of the village was 99.63% White and 0.37% Asian. Hispanic or Latino of any race were 0.74% of the population.

There were 91 households, out of which 37.4% had children under the age of 18 living with them, 63.7% were married couples living together, 8.8% had a female householder with no husband present, and 22.0% were non-families. 19.8% of all households were made up of individuals, and 3.3% had someone living alone who was 65 years of age or older. The average household size was 2.96 and the average family size was 3.46.

In the village, the population was spread out, with 33.3% under the age of 18, 6.3% from 18 to 24, 28.1% from 25 to 44, 21.5% from 45 to 64, and 10.7% who were 65 years of age or older. The median age was 37 years. For every 100 females, there were 117.7 males. For every 100 females age 18 and over, there were 106.9 males.

The median income for a household in the village was $52,500, and the median income for a family was $54,643. Males had a median income of $36,042 versus $23,750 for females. The per capita income for the village was $16,363. About 4.5% of families and 1.8% of the population were below the poverty line, including 1.8% of those under the age of eighteen and none of those 65 or over.

References

Villages in St. Charles County, Missouri
Villages in Missouri